Agustín Macome (born 23 June 1967) is a former Argentine rugby union player. He played as a flanker.

Macome played for Tucumán Rugby Club in the Nacional de Clubes of Argentina.

He had 4 caps for Argentina, from 1990 to 1994, scoring 1 try, 4 points on aggregate. He was called for the 1995 Rugby World Cup, but he never played.

References

External links

1967 births
Argentine rugby union players
Argentina international rugby union players
Tucumán Rugby Club players
Rugby union flankers
Living people